Bayerfeld-Steckweiler is a municipality in the Donnersbergkreis district, in Rhineland-Palatinate, Germany. Bayerfeld-Steckweiler has an area of 1.49 km² and a population of 408 (as of December 31, 2020).

References

Municipalities in Rhineland-Palatinate
Donnersbergkreis